Jūrkalne parish is an administrative unit of the Ventspils Municipality, Latvia. The parish has a population of 369 (as of 1/07/2010) and covers an area of 99.59 km2.

Villages of Jūrkalne parish 
 Jūrkalne

External links 
Jūrkalne parish in Latvian and English

Parishes of Latvia
Ventspils Municipality